Valentina Liashenko (born 30 January 1981) is a female high jumper from Georgia.

She competed in the Women's high jump event at the 2015 World Championships in Athletics in Beijing, China.

Competition record

References

External links

http://www.european-athletics.org/athletes/group=l/athlete=131952-liashenko-valentina/index.html
http://www.zimbio.com/pictures/12eRQjm6zRR/23rd+European+Athletics+Championships+Day/Valentina+Liashenko
https://www.youtube.com/watch?v=NmyN4S6sW7E

Female high jumpers
High jumpers from Georgia (country)
Living people
Sportspeople from Kyiv
1981 births
Female athletes from Georgia (country)
World Athletics Championships athletes for Georgia (country)
Olympic athletes of Georgia (country)
Athletes (track and field) at the 2016 Summer Olympics
Georgian people of Ukrainian descent